Ornela Vorpsi (3 August 1968, Tirana), is an Albanian writer and photographer from the famous Vorpsi family in Tirana. Ornela studied at the Academy of Fine Arts of Brera in Milan, and has been living and working in Paris since 1997. In 2012 she was named one of the 35 best writers of Europe in Best European Fiction by Aleksander Hemon and Zadie Smith.

Novels
 2001 – Nothing Obvious
 2003 – The Country Where One Never Dies
 2006 – Pink Glass
 2007 – The hand that does not bite
 2010 – Drink Cocoa van Houten!
 2012 – Fuorimondo 
 2015 – Travel Around the Mother

References

1968 births
People from Tirana
Albanian women writers
21st-century Albanian women writers
21st-century Albanian writers
Albanian women artists
Brera Academy alumni
Living people
Albanian photographers
Albanian women photographers
21st-century novelists
21st-century photographers
Albanian women novelists
Albanian novelists
Albanian expatriates in France
Albanian artists
21st-century women photographers